Reuben Zellman is an American teacher, author, rabbi, and musician. He became the first openly transgender person accepted to the Reform Jewish seminary Hebrew Union College-Jewish Institute of Religion in 2003.

Education
Zellman received his B.A. in Linguistics from the University of California, Berkeley. He received his master's degree in Hebrew literature from Hebrew Union College-Jewish Institute of Religion in Los Angeles. He was ordained as a rabbi by the seminary in 2010. He received a master's in choral conducting from San Francisco State University.

Career
From 2010 to 2018, Zellman served as the assistant rabbi and music director at Congregation Beth El in Berkeley, California. He is a lecturer in the music department of San Francisco State University, where he directs the Treble Singers, formerly known as the Women's Chorus.  Zellman also directs the New Voices Bay Area TIGQ Chorus, a chorus for transgender, intersex, and genderqueer singers, at the Community Music Center in San Francisco. He sings as a countertenor in the Choir of Men and Boys at Grace Cathedral, San Francisco.

Zellman writes and teaches about transgender issues and Judaism. He has been involved with transgender activism since 1999, the year he transitioned.

Personal life
Zellman was born and raised in California, and has lived mostly in the San Francisco Bay Area since 1996. Zellman is intersex and identifies as neither male nor female. In 1999 he adopted he/his pronouns and a masculine gender expression, as he experienced harassment and felt it was "very dangerous" to have a non-binary presentation at that time.

See also
Elliot Kukla, first openly transgender person ordained by Reform Judaism (2006)

References

1970s births
Living people
American Reform rabbis
Hebrew Union College – Jewish Institute of Religion alumni
Intersex non-binary people
Jewish American writers
LGBT rabbis
LGBT people from California
Non-binary musicians
Non-binary writers
People from Los Angeles
San Francisco State University alumni
Transgender Jews
UC Berkeley College of Letters and Science alumni
Intersex writers
21st-century American Jews
Intersex musicians